Falsicingulidae is a family of very small sea snails, marine gastropod molluscs in the clade Littorinimorpha.

Genera
Genera within the family Falsicingulidae include:
 Falsicingula, the type genus

References 

 The Taxonomicon